The World Radiosport Team Championship is an amateur radio competition. Participation is by invitation only. Entry to each quadrennial WRTC requires qualification through high positions in major world radio contests. The main principle of the WRTC is to provide a level playing field for the qualified contestants from around the world to compete against one another using amateur radio stations located in areas with the same propagation terrain and equipped with identical antennas, operating under the keen eyes of qualified referees. Each WRTC event is organised by a volunteer group of Radio Amateurs in the locality where the competition will be held with the help of a standing committee of internationally recognized contesters. The WRTC is the closest thing to a world championship in the sport of radio contesting. In 2018 over 1000 people are involved with a cost of over half a million Euros.
WRTC2018 web page

History

The first World Radiosport Team Championship event was held in July, 1990 in Seattle, Washington, United States and was timed to coincide with the Goodwill Games being held that summer in the same city. Teams of two competitors each operated in a unique, one-time contest, created specifically to coincide with WRTC. All of the stations used by the WRTC teams were located at existing amateur radio stations in the Seattle area, but not all of the stations were in equally advantageous locations, and some had more desirable call signs than others. Twenty-two teams of two operators each represented Brazil, Bulgaria, Canada, Czechoslovakia, Finland, France, Germany, Hungary, Italy, Japan, the Soviet Union, Spain, the United Kingdom, the United States, and Yugoslavia. For some competitors, it was their first trip to a nation outside of the Eastern Bloc. In addition to the two team members, a referee was present at each station to monitor compliance with the WRTC rules. First place went to the team of John Dorr, K1AR and Doug Grant, K1DG of the United States, second place to the team of Mike Wetzel, W9RE and Chip Margelli, K7JA of the United States, and third place went to Jeff Steinman, KRØY and Bob Shohet, KQ2M of the United States.

The next WRTC event was held in the San Francisco, California, USA area in July, 1996, and was organized by the Northern California Contest Club. The format continued to be teams of two competitors each, operating at stations with similar antenna and power restrictions, participating in the IARU HF World Championship, a world-wide operating event that includes both phone and CW operation. A major innovation at WRTC 1996 was the assignment of special-event call signs to each of the competitive stations. The call signs were assigned randomly to each team, and helped prevent other stations in the IARU HF World Championship contest from recognizing their friends. The special call signs also ensured that all stations had call signs that took approximately the same amount of time to speak phonetically or to send in Morse code. Fifty-two teams of two operators each represented twenty-four countries and all six inhabited continents. First place went to the team of Jeff Steinman, KRØY and Dan Street, K1TO of the United States, second place to the team of John Laney III, K4BAI and Bill Fisher, KM9P of the United States, and third place went to the team of Dave Hachadorian, K6LL and Steve London, N2IC of the United States.

WRTC 2000 was held in July in Slovenia. While the event headquarters were in the resort city of Bled, the competitive stations were spread throughout the country. Most competitors arriving in Slovenia were greeted by ceremonial military escort and the nation's top political figures were in attendance at the opening and closing ceremonies. A new innovation to the competition was the inclusion of a "pile-up" competition, in which individual competitors listened to a recording of overlapping call signs sent in Morse code and attempted to accurately identify and record as many as possible. WRTC 2000 was also the first event where all stations were equipped with antennas of identical manufacture installed at identical heights above ground. Fifty-three teams of two operators each represented twenty-five nations. First place went to the team of Jeff Steinman, N5TJ (formerly KRØY) and Dan Street, K1TO of the United States, second place to the team of Igor Booklan, RA3AUU and Andrei Karpov, RV1AW of Russia, and third place went to the team of Doug Grant, K1DG and John Dorr, K1AR of the United States.

WRTC 2002 was held in July in Helsinki, Finland. A major innovation in Finland was a near-real-time scoreboard publish on a web site during the event. On-site referees at each WRTC competition station used cellular phones to send their station's running contact totals and score to a central database each hour. The scores were published during the event on a web site that listed only the call signs of the operators at each site, not the randomly assigned special-event call sign being used on the air. Fifty-two teams of two operators each represented twenty-eight countries. First place went to the team of Jeff Steinman, N5TJ and Dan Street, K1TO of the United States, second place to the team of Igor Booklan, RA3AUU and Andrei Karpov, RV1AW of Russia, and third place went to the team of Frank Grossmann, DL2CC and Bernd Och, DL6FBL of Germany.

WRTC 2006 was held in Florianópolis, Brazil, and introduced a sophisticated qualification scoring system for potential competitors. 47 teams were selected for the event, but only 46 actually participated. Brazilian airline Varig declared bankruptcy on June 26, causing severe travel difficulties for many teams traveling to Florianópolis the following week, and the Czech team was unable to make other travel arrangements in time. Teams were provided with larger antennas and 700 watt amplifiers in 2006, to help compensate for the greater distance from Brazil to the main centers of contesting activity in Europe and North America. Despite taking place during the solar minimum, the contest coincided with a short spike in conditions on the HF bands allowing high scores. After winning three WRTCs in a row, Jeff Steinman, N5TJ and Dan Street, K1TO did not compete in the 2006 event. First place went to John Sluymer VE3EJ and James Roberts VE7ZO of Canada, the first time a team from outside the United States had won the WRTC competition. Dan Craig N6MJ and Dave Mueller N2NL of the United States achieved second place, and third place went to Doug Grant, K1DG and Andy Blank, N2NT of the United States. Ranko Boca, YT6A (now 4O3A) and Djurica Maletin, YT6T of Montenegro had been in third place in preliminary results, but after a scoring adjudication that removed "unique" contacts from WRTC logs, were rescored into eleventh place.

WRTC 2010 was held in Moscow, Russia, organized by the Russian Amateur Radio Union. 48 teams representing 24 countries participated. For the first time in WRTC history, all operating sites were as equal as possible, using flat fields with no significant location advantages. Volunteers from radio clubs all over Russia installed identical antennas and tents at each site. All competitors operated "Field Day style" using portable electric generators. Also new in WRTC 2010, both operators were allowed to operate at the same time, interleaving contacts, as long as only one transmitted at a time, an operating style borrowed from the Russian Radiosport Team Championship (RRTC). Most participants used a triplexer or diplexer to enable the tri-band Yagi antenna to be shared by both transceivers at the same time without interference. First place went to the Russian team of Vladimir Aksenov, RW1AC and Alexey Mikhailov, RA1AIP. Tõnno Vähk, ES5TV and Toivo Hallikivi, ES2RR from Estonia came in second. Dan Craig, N6MJ and Chris Hurlbut, KL9A from the U.S.A. finished third.

WRTC 2014 was held primarily in Eastern Massachusetts, USA. 59 teams representing 39 countries participated in the largest WRTC competition ever held.  Similar to WRTC 2010, temporary locations with tents, generators, a 40-foot tower with tri-band Yagi and inverted vee antennas were constructed by over 400 local volunteers.  One station was located just across the border in New Hampshire.  For the first time in WRTC history, both operators were allowed to transmit simultaneously, as in a "Multioperator, Two-Transmitter" (M/2) competition, providing more opportunity for participants around the world to work the competitors on as many bands as possible.  First place went to Dan Craig, N6MJ and Chris Hurlbut, KL9A from the U.S.A.  Rastislav Hrnko, OM3BH, and Jozef Lang, OM3GI from Slovakia, finished second.  Manfred Wolf, DJ5MW and Stefan von Baltz, DL1IAO from Germany finished third, just edging out the American team of Kevin Stockton, N5DX and Steve London, N2IC, by a single multiplier.

WRTC 2018 was held in Wittenberg, Germany. First place went to Gediminas Lucinskas, LY9A and Mindaugas Jukna, LY4L from Lithuania.

Competition

The process of selection and invitation to compete in the World Radiosport Team Championship has varied with each event. In some years, the selection has been entirely at the discretion of the organizing committee, which has generally relied upon the past contest results of individuals who have applied for inclusion in the competition to make their decisions. In other years, selection has been delegated to national radio societies or major contest clubs, which have voted on the contesters that they wanted to represent them. The selection process is generally structured to ensure a certain number of contesters from each part of the world and a certain number from specific countries will be invited to the competition. Participants selected to compete in WRTC are generally not sponsored and must pay their own travel and lodging expenses in order to attend.

Each team of two contesters participates in the IARU HF World Championship radio contest, held on the second full weekend of July. A random draw is done to assign each team to a particular station, referee, and call sign. Teams are generally allowed to bring their own transceivers, headphones, microphones, telegraph keys, and contest logging software, but are required to use the antennas provided for them at their assigned station. In addition to respecting the rules of the IARU HF World Championship contest, WRTC teams might have additional operating restrictions. Historically, the scoring formula used for WRTC stations has not always been the same as the scoring formula used for the IARU HF World Championship. On-site referees are present to ensure compliance with the WRTC competition rules. Many WRTC site referees are former WRTC competitors.

Official WRTC web sites
 WRTC 2018 Wittenberg, Germany
 Results
 WRTC 2014 New England, USA
 Results
 WRTC 2010 Moscow-Domodedovo, Russia
 Results
 WRTC 2006 Florianópolis, Brazil
 Results
 WRTC 2002 Helsinki, Finland
 Results
 WRTC 2000 Ljubljana, Slovenia
 Results
 WRTC 1996 San Francisco, California, USA
 Results
 WRTC 1990 Seattle, Washington, USA
 Results

See also
 Radiosport
 WRTC.info

References

 Bibliography of WRTC articles in the National Contest Journal
 Baltz, Stefan DL1IAO (1996).  "WRTC 1996 in San Francisco".  Retrieved Dec. 5, 2005.
 Bell, Dave W6AQ (2000).  The Ham Radio Olympics.  Documentary video.  YouTube Video, Mar. 26, 2014.
 Icom America /Bell, Dave W6AQ / Webb, John W7NWH (2008).  24 Hours in Brazil.  Documentary Feb. 02, 2008.
 Brooks, James 9V1YC (2002).  WRTC Finland 2002. Documentary video.
 Brooks, James 9V1YC (2015).  WRTC2014 New England. Documentary video.
 Burger, Chris ZS6EZ (2000).  "Chris R. Burger's Report on WRTC2000".  Retrieved Dec. 5, 2005.
 Burger, Chris ZS6EZ (2014).  "Visit to New England, July 2014 (including WRTC)".  Retrieved Oct. 8, 2014.
 Lindquist, Rick N1RL, ed. (1996).  ""KRØY-K1TO Team Tops WRTC-96.  ARRL Letter. July 19, 1996.
 Lindquist, Rick N1RL, ed. (2000).  "WRTC-2000 Competitors Head for Slovenia".  ARRL Letter, Volume 19, Number 25 (June 30, 2000).
 Southgate Amateur Radio Club (2006).   "WRTC 2010 to be held in Russia". Retrieved October 30, 2006.
 Thiel, Emily P43E (2002).  "WRTC 2002, Helsinki, Finland". Retrieved Dec. 5, 2005.
 WJET-TV (1996).  WRTC San Francisco.  Documentary video.  YouTubeVideo, Mar. 26, 2014.

Radiosport
Radiosport
Recurring sporting events established in 1990